Hermann Roock is a former West German slalom canoeist who competed from the late 1950s to the late 1960s.

He won a three medals in the C-2 team event at the ICF Canoe Slalom World Championships with a gold in 1969, a silver in 1963 and a bronze in 1965.

References
Overview of athlete's results at canoeslalom.net 

German male canoeists
Possibly living people
Year of birth missing (living people)
Medalists at the ICF Canoe Slalom World Championships